Abaturov (masculine) or Abaturova (feminine) is a Russian last name. It derives from the Russian dialectal word "" (abatur), meaning a stubborn, capricious person.

The following people share this last name:
Yury Abaturov, commanding pilot of Aeroflot Flight 2230, which crashed after takeoff in 1967
Yuriy Abaturov, Slovak association football player for MFK Vranov nad Topľou

See also
Abaturovo, several rural localities in Russia

References

Notes

Sources
Ю. А. Федосюк (Yu. A. Fedosyuk). "Русские фамилии: популярный этимологический словарь" (Russian Last Names: a Popular Etymological Dictionary). Москва, 2006. 

Russian-language surnames
